Greatest Hits is a greatest hits album by The Partridge Family released by Arista in 1989. It was never released on vinyl, only on cassette and compact disc, and is the first Partridge Family album to ever be released on CD. It contains 16 songs, including the TV show's second theme song, "Come on Get Happy" which was never featured on a Partridge family album, and two songs by David Cassidy as a solo act: "Cherish" and "Could It Be Forever". It has liner notes by Danny Bonaduce and a Partridge Family trivia quiz. The cover has a picture of a period lunchbox with a cartoon picture of the family in red velvet suits.

Critical reception

Stephen Thomas Erlewine of AllMusic writes, "Although they weren't as good as The Cowsills, who served as at least partial inspiration for the group, The Partridge Family had their fair share of first-rate bubblegum singles in the early '70s. Greatest Hits does an excellent job of summarizing those glory days"

Track listing

Track information and credits adapted the album's liner notes.

References

The Partridge Family albums
1989 greatest hits albums
Albums produced by Wes Farrell
Arista Records compilation albums